Daniel Guzmán Miranda (born 28 June 1992) is a Mexican professional footballer who plays as a forward.

Club career
Guzmán Miranda signed as a youth with Mexican club Santos Laguna and has been on loan for the last five years. He has played with Veracruz FC, Club UDG and Ballenas Galeana, all in the Ascenso MX and will finally play Primera División (first division) after signing with Puebla for the 2014 season.

Personal life 
Guzmán Miranda is the son of former Mexican football player Daniel Guzmán who currently is the coach of Leones Negros who play in Ascenso MX.

References

External links

1992 births
Living people
Mexican people of Spanish descent
Mexican footballers
Mexican expatriate footballers
Footballers from Guadalajara, Jalisco
Santos Laguna footballers
C.D. Veracruz footballers
Leones Negros UdeG footballers
Ballenas Galeana Morelos footballers
Alebrijes de Oaxaca players
C.D. Suchitepéquez players
C.D. Guastatoya players
Club Puebla players
Las Vegas Lights FC players
Ascenso MX players
USL Championship players
Liga Nacional de Fútbol de Guatemala players
Association football forwards
Mexican expatriate sportspeople in the United States
Expatriate soccer players in the United States
Mexican expatriate sportspeople in Guatemala
Expatriate footballers in Guatemala